The 2020–21 season was Al-Taawoun's 65th year in their history and 11th consecutive season in the Pro League. This season Al-Taawoun participated in the Pro League and the King Cup.

The season covers the period from 27 September 2020 to 30 June 2021.

Players

Squad information

Out on loan

Transfers and loans

Transfers in

Loans in

Transfers out

Loans out

Competitions

Overview

Goalscorers

Last Updated: 30 May 2021

Assists

Last Updated: 30 May 2021

Clean sheets

Last Updated: 30 May 2021

References

Al-Taawoun FC seasons
Taawoun